St. Raymond's Church may refer to:

Old St. Raymond's Church Dublin, California, listed on the NRHP in California 
Cathedral of St. Raymond Nonnatus Joliet, Illinois
St. Raymond's Church (Bronx, New York)